The Malta Amateur Athletic Association is the governing body for the sport of athletics in Malta.  Matthew Micallef St John Athletics Stadium in Marsa is the home of Maltese Athletics. The objectives for which the Association is established are to encourage, promote, develop and control athletics in Malta amongst all as a means of promoting physical health and well-being.

Maltese representation in Athletics at Summer Olympics:

Maltese Athletics were present for the first time on the international scene during the Olympic Games in Berlin in 1936. Coming so close at the end of WWII with Malta still devastated from the German bombings, Maltese Athletics with Nestor Jacono was Malta's sole representative at the 1948 London Olympiad. Nestor Jacono (February 15, 1925 – May 4, 2014) was a Maltese athlete who competed in the Men's 100 metres sprint at the 1948 Olympics. In 2005 he was included in the Hall of Fame of the Maltese Olympic Committee. Before he died in May 2014, he was the Maltese oldest living Olympian. Athletics was again present in the 1984 Los Angeles Olympics with one athlete in Women's Javelin Throw, Jennifer Pace the only Maltese field athlete ever present at an Olmpiad. 1992 Barcelona Olympics Maltese Athletics was on show with Athletics Women's 100 metres Deirdre Caruana (100m, 200m) and Carol Galea (800m, 1500m). In Atlanta 1996 Mario Bonello (100m) and Carol Galea (Marathon) were our athletes on the Track. Track was present again in Sydney 2000 Olympics with Mario Bonello (100m) and Suzanne Spiteri (100m). Athens 2004 Olympics saw the participation of Darren Gilford (100m) and Tanya Blake (800m).The athletes sent by the Malta Olympic Committee for the Beijing Olympics were sprinters Nikolai Portelli (200m) and Charlene Attard (100m). Among the Maltese delegation for the 2012 London Olympics were two track and field athletes, Rachid Chouhal and Diane Borg (both 100m). Malta also competed in the 2016 Summer Olympics in Rio de Janeiro, Brazil and athletics was present through Luke Bezzina (100m) and Charlotte Wingfield (100m).

Affiliations 
International Association of Athletics Federations (IAAF)
European Athletic Association (EAA)
Malta Olympic Committee

National records 
MAAA maintains the Maltese records in athletics.

External links 
Official webpage

Malta
Athletics
National governing bodies for athletics